Crowder College is a public community college in Neosho, Missouri. It serves the Community College District of Newton and McDonald counties in southwestern Missouri and other outlying areas. The school enrolled 4,398 in 2019.

Established in 1963 on the grounds of the former Fort Crowder, the college grants certificates, diplomas, and associate degrees. Its name honors General Enoch Crowder, a prominent Missourian, soldier, and statesman, as well as the veterans of World War I, who received their training at Fort Crowder.

Accreditation and affiliation 
Crowder College is accredited by the Higher Learning Commission and approved by the Missouri Department of Elementary and Secondary Education and Coordinating Board for Higher Education. Specific programs are approved or accredited by the Missouri State Board of Nursing, Teacher Education Certification, through the Department of Elementary and Secondary Education, and the National Institute for Automotive Excellence (ASE).

Graduates of the Associate of Arts programs are admitted without examination to junior standing in all public universities and colleges in Missouri and many outside the state of Missouri. Crowder is an member of the Missouri Community College Association and the American Association of Community Colleges.

Longwell Museum
The Longwell Museum, located in the Crowder College Elsie Plaster Community Center, has many displays and artifacts from the Fort Crowder days, when over 50,000 soldiers were stationed there. The museum also holds artwork by artists associated with Neosho, including Thomas Hart Benton and James Duard Marshall.  In 1989, the Longwell Museum hosted the "Benton and Friends" exhibition in honor of the centennial of Thomas Hart Benton's birth.  That exhibition brought together more than 80 works by Benton, John Steuart Curry, James Duard Marshall, Charles Banks Wilson, and Grant Wood.

Recognition 

Crowder's solar team designed and built the first solar powered vehicle to successfully complete a coast to coast journey across the United States in 1984. Since then Crowder has continued to distinguish itself in world and national solar energy competitions, most recently the Solar Decathlon in Washington, D.C., where the solar house entry from Crowder was selected as the “People’s Choice” and placed 6th overall in the competition. Crowder was the only community college in the competition. This award-winning house is now located on the Crowder campus. The Crowder campus includes a wind powered turbine supplying energy to the MARET (Missouri Alternative & Renewable Energy Technology) Center.

 1984—designed and built the first solar-powered vehicle to successfully cross the United States.
 1987—competed in the first World Solar Challenge, Australia; finished second, behind General Motors.
 1990—competed in the first GM Sunrayce in America; finished fifth.
 1990—placed eighth out of 32 international teams in the second World Solar Challenge.
 1992—traveled to Japan for the Grand Solar Challenge.
 1994—finished second in an electric vehicle race in Phoenix, AZ.
 1996—working with Upward Bound students, placed third at the Grand Solar Cycle Challenge in Japan.
 1998—competed in the first Ethanol Vehicle Challenge.
 1999—competed in the World Solar Cycle Challenge in Australia.
 2000—placed first in the fuel-efficiency category of the second Ethanol Vehicle Challenge.
 2001—placed first in class and second overall; Solar Bike Race USA.
 2002—only community college entry to compete with 13 universities in the 2002 Solar Decathlon project.

References

External links 

 
Educational institutions established in 1963
Universities and colleges accredited by the Southern Association of Colleges and Schools
Buildings and structures in Newton County, Missouri
Education in Newton County, Missouri
1963 establishments in Missouri
Community colleges in Missouri
Two-year colleges in the United States